Paschal McGuinness (born October 2, 1933) is a retired labor union activist.

Early life and career
Paschal was born in County Cavan, Ireland.  During his early life, he learned the Carpenter trade via an apprenticeship program. After emigrating to the United States, Paschal joined Local Union 608 of the United Brotherhood of Carpenters and Joiners of America in November 1957. Paschal McGuinness lives in Spring Lake NJ and Myrtle Beach, SC.

Local 608 Tenure
United Brotherhood of Carpenters Local Union 608 was organized in 1911, and dissolved in 2010. After working as a Carpenter and Superintendent for a number of years, Paschal was appointed Business Agent by Local 608 President, John O'Connor in the 1970s.  Paschal eventually took over the role of Business Manager after Big John O'Connor moved to the NYC District Council of Carpenters.  Eventually, when the District Council of Carpenters was coming out of trusteeship, Paschal ran against Big John O'Connor and won in 1984, a position he held until 1991.  This effectively forced O'Connor to retire.  Paschal held the position of President of the New York City District Council of Carpenters as well as President of Local Union 608.  After having a RICO suit filed against him and the council, Paschal agreed to a Consent Decree with the US Government. Paschal was elected to office of Second Vice President in the United Brotherhood of Carpenters in Washington DC.  The Consent Decree is still in effect with a Federal Judge and an Independent Investigator overseeing the operations of the NYC District Council, and its affiliated Local Unions.

Local 608 Dissolved
After years of trying to root out corruption, and having 5 Presidents (and other officers) in a 1-year period, the President of the United Brotherhood of Carpenter's, decided to dissolve Local Union 608 on December 14, 2010.  From its beginnings in 1918, the Local served a mostly Irish community of carpenters, and is no more.

NYC District Council
Paschal was the managing trustee of the NYC District Council of Carpenters Benefit Funds when it purchased and renovated the new headquarters building at 395 Hudson Street in NYC at a cost that exceeded $120 million despite a $73 million appraisal.  The building is often referred to as Paschal's Palace.

Building and Construction Trades Department
After the UBC election of 1991 had been overturned by the United States Department of Labor (DOL), the DOL sued the UBC and reached a settlement in 1995 calling for a new election, McGuinness retired from his position as First Vice President of the United Brotherhood of Carpenters, allowing Douglas McCarron to advance to that position. McGuiness was then elected Secretary-Treasurer of the Building and Construction Trades Department of the AFL-CIO in 1995, a position he would have to give up due to federal investigations.

Indictments
There were several indictments of Paschal during his tenure as Business Manager and President of Local Union 608.  These indictments culminated in the signing of the Consent Decree  of the District Council with the Federal Government. The Consent Decree forced McGuinness out of Union office in the State of New York, and also left the District Council under the control of an Independent Investigator from circa 1994.  The District Council is still under the constraints of the Consent Decree and a Federal Judge.  It is questionable if the government attempts at rooting out corruption has been successful or not. McGuinness was acquitted of several charges at trial  while his co-workers were not as successful.

Mafia
There have been reputed rumors that Paschal McGuinness was under the control of the Mafia during his tenure of President of the District Council

References

1933 births
Living people
American trade unionists of Irish descent
Irish emigrants to the United States
United Brotherhood of Carpenters and Joiners of America people
Trade unionists from New York (state)